Jodie Gibson (born 30 October 1992) is an English netball player. She was part of the England squad that won gold at the 2018 Commonwealth Games. At a club level, she represents Saracens Mavericks and has previously played for Severn Stars, Manchester Thunder and Loughborough Lightning.

References

1992 births
Living people
Sportspeople from Bury, Greater Manchester
English netball players
Netball players at the 2018 Commonwealth Games
Commonwealth Games gold medallists for England
Commonwealth Games medallists in netball
Loughborough Lightning netball players
Mavericks netball players
Manchester Thunder players
Severn Stars players
Netball Superleague players
Medallists at the 2018 Commonwealth Games